CVP may mean:

Medicine
 Central venous pressure, the pressure of blood in the thoracic vena cava
 CVP (chemotherapy), regime of Cyclophosphamide + Vincristine + Prednisone/Prednisolone

Water
 Crane Valley Partnership, related to the River Crane, London, England
 Central Valley Project, water project in California, USA

Transport
 Continuous Voyage Permit, related to Transport in Australia
 CVP, the code for Kovilpatti railway station, Tamil Nadu

Organisations
 Christelijke Volkspartij, Belgian political party, later renamed Christen-Democratisch en Vlaams (CD&V)
 Christlichdemokratische Volkspartei der Schweiz, the Christian Democratic People's Party of Switzerland

Business
 Corporación Venezolana de Petroleo, a subsidiary of Petróleos de Venezuela S.A.
 CVP analysis (Cost-Volume-Profit analysis)
 Customer value proposition

Science and technology
 Content Vectoring Protocol
 Closest vector problem
 Circuit value problem, in computer science

Other
 The Chess Variant Pages, A website about chess variants